The 2006 Men's European Water Polo Championship' was the 27th exhibition of the event organised by the Europe's governing body in aquatics, the Ligue Européenne de Natation. The event took place in the Tašmajdan Sports Centre in Belgrade, Serbia, from 1 to 10 September 2006.

There were three qualification tournaments ahead of the event, held from 7 to 9 April 2006 in Kranj, Slovenia (with France, Slovenia, Slovakia and Malta competing), in Eindhoven, Netherlands (Greece, Netherlands, Poland and Moldova), and in Imperia, Italy (Belarus, Italy, Romania and Turkey).

Qualification

Teams

GROUP A
 

 
 
 
 

GROUP B

Preliminary round

Group A

September 1, 2006 

September 2, 2006 

September 3, 2006 

September 4, 2006 

September 5, 2006

Group B

September 1, 2006 

September 2, 2006 

September 3, 2006 

September 4, 2006 

September 5, 2006

Final round

Places 7/12
September 7, 2006 

September 8, 2006

Places 11 / 12
September 8, 2006

Places 9 / 10
September 9, 2006

Places 7 / 8
September 9, 2006

Quarterfinals
September 7, 2006

Semifinals
September 8, 2006

Finals

Places 5 / 6
September 9, 2006

Bronze medal
September 10, 2006

Gold medal
September 10, 2006

Final ranking

Team roster
Denis Šefik, Petar Trbojević, Živko Gocić, Vanja Udovičić, Dejan Savić, Danilo Ikodinović, Slobodan Nikić, Filip Filipović, Aleksandar Ćirić, Aleksandar Šapić, Vladimir Vujasinović, Branko Peković, Slobodan Soro, Duško Pijetlović, and Andrija Prlainović

Head coach: Dejan Udovičić

Individual awards
 Most Valuable Player
 

 Best Goalkeeper
 

 Topscorer
 — 33 goals

Medalists

Top scorers

References
 LEN website

Men
Men's European Water Polo Championship
International water polo competitions hosted by Serbia
European Championship
Water polo
International sports competitions in Belgrade
2000s in Belgrade
September 2006 sports events in Europe